This is a list of newspapers in Texas, United States.

Daily, weekly, and other newspapers

College newspapers
 The Battalion – Texas A&M University
 The Baylor Lariat – Baylor University
 The Brand – Hardin-Simmons University
 The Collegian – Houston Baptist University
 The Daily Campus - Southern Methodist University
 The Daily Cougar – University of Houston
 TCU Daily Skiff – Texas Christian University
 The Daily Texan – University of Texas at Austin
 The Daily Toreador – Texas Tech University
 The Dateline Downtown – University of Houston–Downtown
 The East Texan – Texas A&M University-Commerce
 The Flame – University of Houston–Victoria
 Hilltop Views – St. Edward's University
 The Houstonian – Sam Houston State University
 The Mercury – The University of Texas at Dallas 
 The Mesquite – Texas A&M University-San Antonio
 North Texas Daily – University of North Texas
 The Pacer – Angelina College
 The Paisano – University of Texas at San Antonio
 The Pine Log – Stephen F. Austin State University
 The Prospector – University of Texas at El Paso
 Ram Page – Angelo State University
 The Rattler – St. Mary's University
 Rice Thresher – Rice University
The Shorthorn – University of Texas at Arlington
 The Signal – University of Houston–Clear Lake
 Trinitonian – Trinity University
University Press – Lamar University
The University Star – Texas State University
The Logos – University of the Incarnate Word

Foreign-language newspapers

Military newspapers
 Brooks City-Base Discovery
 Fort Hood Herald 
 Fort Hood Sentinel 
 JBSA Legacy 
 Kelly USA Observer
 Medical Patriot

Defunct newspapers

See also
 Texas media
 List of radio stations in Texas
 List of television stations in Texas
 Media of cities in Texas: Abilene, Amarillo, Austin, Beaumont, Brownsville, Dallas, Denton, El Paso, Fort Worth, Houston, Killeen, Laredo, Lubbock, McAllen, McKinney, Midland, Odessa, San Antonio, Waco, Wichita Falls
 Journalism:
 :Category:Journalists from Texas
 Press Women of Texas
 Journalism schools:
 University of Texas Moody College of Communication, in Austin
 Abilene Christian University College of Arts and Sciences Department of Journalism and Mass Communication
 Texas Christian University Schieffer College of Communication, Dept. of Journalism (est. 1927), in Fort Worth
 Texas State University School of Journalism and Mass Communication, in San Marcos 
 University of Houston Valenti School of Communication
 University of North Texas Mayborn School of Journalism, in Denton
 Texas literature

References

Bibliography
 
 
 
 
 
 
 History of the Texas Press and the Texas Press Association (Dallas: Harben-Spotts, 1929)
  
 
 
  (Includes information about newspapers)
 Marilyn M. Sibley, Lone Stars and State Gazettes: Texas Newspapers before the Civil War (College Station: Texas A&M University Press, 1983)
 
 
 
 

External links

 
 
 
 
 . (Survey of local news existence and ownership in 21st century)
  (Directory ceased in 2017)
  (Publicly accessible digital library including newspapers published in El Paso)
 
  (Includes Texas newspapers)
 
 
 
 
 

Newspapers
Texas